The 2001 Italia rugby union tour was a series of matches played in June and July 2001 in Africa and South America by Italy national rugby union team.

It was a bad tour, with only victory against modest teams of Namibia and Uruguay.

Results

'Scores and results list Italy's points tally first.

2001 rugby union tours
tour
2001
2001 in South African rugby union
2001 in Argentine rugby union
2001 in African rugby union
2001 in South American rugby union
2001 in Uruguayan sport
June 2001 sports events in Africa
July 2001 sports events in Africa
2001
2001
2001
2001